This is a list of Men's Division I college basketball teams ranked by winning percentage through the end of the 2019–20 season. It includes only those schools that have spent at least 25 years in Division I.

Note: Records are adjusted with vacated and forfeited games not included like they are in the NCAA record book.

See also
College basketball
List of teams with the most victories in NCAA Division I men's college basketball

References
NCAA Division I Men's Basketball Official Recordbook (most successful teams through 2019-2020 season by all-time wins and all time winning percentage are listed on page 75)

College men's basketball records and statistics in the United States